Aplastodiscus musicus is a species of frog in the family Hylidae.
It is endemic to Brazil.
Its natural habitats are subtropical or tropical moist montane forests and rivers.
It is threatened by habitat loss.

References

Sources

Aplastodiscus
Endemic fauna of Brazil
Amphibians described in 1948
Taxonomy articles created by Polbot